William Kempster (1914–1977) was a British artist, best known for his mural British Air Transport, which was commissioned by British Airports Authority in 1969 for Heathrow Airport, London and then displayed in Terminal One until 2015.

Early life
William Kempster was born in 1914.

Career

With Barry Evans, Kempster painted a mural for the Festival of Britain in 1951.

Also with Evans, he was an illustrator for James Fisher’s The Wonderful World: The Adventure of the Earth We Live On (1954). In addition, he designed a stamp to celebrate the 1966 Football World Cup.

Kempster is best known for his mural British Air Transport, which was commissioned by British Airports Authority in 1969 for Heathrow Airport, London and then displayed in Terminal One until 2015. It was unveiled in 1969 by Queen Elizabeth II and Prince Philip, and it illustrates pioneer British airlines and a number of well-known pilots. In 2018, it was loaned to the Historic Croydon Airport Trust by the Maas Gallery and transferred to be displayed at Croydon Airport.

Death
Kempster died in 1977.

References

External links 

 Kempster's works

1914 births
1977 deaths
British genre painters
English illustrators
English male painters
20th-century English painters
British stamp designers
20th-century English male artists